Doru taeniatum, the lined earwig, is a species of earwig in the family Forficulidae. It is found in Central America, North America, and South America.

References

Further reading

External links

 

Forficulidae
Articles created by Qbugbot
Insects described in 1862